Guadalupe Garcia McCall is an author, poet, and educator. She was born in Piedras Negras, Coahuila, Mexico.  She is the recipient of the 2012 Pura Belpré Medal for narrative.

Early life 
Guadalupe Garcia McCall was born in Coauhila, a Mexican state adjacent to Texas. She immigrated to the United States with her family when she was six years old, and grew up in Eagle Pass, a small border town in South Texas. When McCall was 17 years old, “she lost her mother to cancer and found solace in her writing and in her education".

Career 
She holds a B.A. in Theatre and English from Sul Ross State University in Alpine and a Master of Fine Arts in Creative Writing from the University of Texas at El Paso. McCall currently serves as an Assistant Professor of English at George Fox University in Newberg, Oregon. Her first novel, Under the Mesquite, debuted in October 2011 and received the prestigious Pura Belpré Medal for narrative in 2012. She has written three more young adult novels in addition to many stories and poems that have been published in periodicals. Garcia McCall has been called "a leading voice in Chicana and Latina children’s and young adult literature".

Awards

Under the Mesquite 
2012 Pura Belpré Medal for narrative

2013 Tomás Rivera Book Award

2012 Americas Award, Consortium of Latin American Studies Program – Honorable Mention

2012 International Latino Book Award – Honorable Mention

Summer of the Mariposas 
2013 Westchester Young Adult Fiction Award – Winner

2013 Andre Norton Award for Young Adult Science Fiction and Fantasy Finalist

2013 Amelia Bloomer Project List

Bibliography 
Under the Mesquite, Lee and Low Books (New York) 2011.
Summer of Mariposas, Tu Books (New York) 2012.
Shame the Stars, Tu Books (New York) 2016.
All the Stars Denied Tu Books (New York) 2018.

References

External links 
 http://guadalupegarciamccall.com/biography/

Living people
Year of birth missing (living people)
American women novelists
American writers of Mexican descent
Mexican emigrants to the United States
People from Piedras Negras, Coahuila
Novelists from Texas
Sul Ross State University alumni
21st-century American novelists
21st-century American women writers